"Pash" is a pop song by Australian singer Kate Ceberano. It was released in 1997 as the first single from her sixth studio album of the same name. The track was co-written by Ceberano with the album's producer, Mark Goldenberg. In March 1998 it peaked at number 10 on the ARIA singles chart and was certified gold by ARIA for shipment of 35,000 copies. In New Zealand, it reached the top 40. At the ARIA Music Awards of 1998, Ceberano was nominated for Best Female Artist for "Pash". AllMusic's Jonathan Lewis reviewed the album and observed, "The '60s-influenced pop of the title track became her biggest hit since 'Bedroom Eyes'."

Background

Australian singer Kate Ceberano had started her solo career in 1987 after providing lead vocals for funk-pop, rock group I'm Talking (1983–1987). Ten years later she prepared material for her sixth studio album, Pash, which appeared in May 1998. It was produced by Mark Goldenberg for Mushroom Records and provided the title track as its lead single, which was issued in November 1997.

"Pash" was co-written by Ceberano and Goldenberg and peaked at No. 10 on the ARIA singles chart. It spent twenty-one weeks on the Australian Singles Chart top 50 and was certified gold by ARIA in March 1998 for shipment of 35,000 copies. On the New Zealand singles chart, it reached number 36.

In October 1998, "Pash" earned Ceberano her ninth nomination for an ARIA Award for Best Female Artist but she lost to Natalie Imbruglia. AllMusic's Jonathan Lewis observed, "The '60s-influenced pop of the title track became her biggest hit since 'Bedroom Eyes'."

Track listing

Australian maxi-single (MUSH01713.2)

 "Pash" (radio edit) (Kate Ceberano, Mark Goldenberg)
 "Helen" (Ceberano, Goldenberg)
 "Pash" (karaoke kiss-along) (Ceberano, Goldenberg)

Charts

Weekly charts

Year-end charts

Certifications

Cover versions
 In 2015, Dorsal Fins covered the song for Triple J Like a Version - Volume 11.

References

1997 singles
1997 songs
Kate Ceberano songs
Mushroom Records singles
Songs written by Kate Ceberano